The Partnership for Peace (PfP) is a North Atlantic Treaty Organization (NATO) program aimed at creating trust between the member states of NATO and other states mostly in Europe, including post-Soviet states; 20 states are members. The program contains six areas of cooperation, which aims to build relationships with partners through military-to-military cooperation on training, exercises, disaster planning and response, science and environmental issues, professionalization, policy planning, and relations with civilian government.

Amidst security concerns in Eastern Europe after the Cold War and dissolution of the Soviet Union, and also due to the failure of the North Atlantic Cooperation Council (NACC), the program was launched during the summit in Brussels, Belgium between January 10 and 11, 1994. In the process, neutral countries also faced a situation in which they had to reconsider maintaining military neutrality; therefore, countries such as Finland, Sweden and Austria joined the Partnership for Peace field activities in 1997.

In the following decade, over the course of the 2000s, the PfP has made great progress. In 2002, it began the Individual Partnership Action Plan in order to provide members an opportunity to be granted further assistance from NATO without having to commit to becoming full members of NATO. The program has additionally started an initiative for education, specifically military education. Over the course of its creation, the program has struggled with funding due to its ever-changing formation of members.

Background
Amidst the security concerns of the post–Cold War era, the North Atlantic Cooperation Council (NACC) was established in 1991 to pay attention to security issues in Eastern Europe. The NACC was first announced at the Rome summit in November 1991 as NATO's first attempt to incorporate the former Soviet Union and its Warsaw Pact allies into European security frameworks. This was intended to form diplomatic links between NATO and Eastern European military officials on industrial and military conversations. After 1991, the NACC held annual ministerial meetings and regular consultations between Eastern and Western representatives of NATO's political, economic, and military committees. The objective of these meetings was to strengthen the relations between Eastern and Western Europe, thereby contributing to the regional political and military stability. However, the council contained 36 members of considerable geographic, economic, and cultural diversity who were at times in political dispute with each other. Eventually, this caused limited actions on the NACC's primary mission. By 1993, a range of Eastern European countries lost confidence in the NACC. The emergence of new states such as Croatia and Ukraine after the split of Czechoslovakia resulted in Slovakian Foreign Minister, Milan Kňažko, urging the creation of a security framework that would facilitate cooperation on all levels with NATO. The shortcomings of the NACC in their insufficiency when dealing with fast-paced regional events, resulted in heightened pressure by NACC members for a membership into the NATO alliance and also the formation of an alternative program.

The concept of the PfP was first discussed by the Bulgarian society Novae, after being proposed as an American initiative at the meeting of NATO defense ministers in Travemünde, Germany, between October 20 and 21, 1993, and formally launched on January 10–11, 1994, at the NATO summit in Brussels, Belgium. According to declassified U.S. State Department records, President Clinton characterized to President Yeltsin the PfP as a "track that will lead to NATO membership" and that "does not draw another line dividing Europe a few hundred miles to the east". In September 1994 Clinton told Yeltsin that NATO would expand, but there was no timetable. By that time, Yeltsin had claimed a Russian sphere of influence covering the Commonwealth of Independent States.

Purpose 
Between October 20 and 21, 1993, in Travemünde, Germany, a meeting for NATO defense ministers was held. In the meeting, the US proposed a program called the Partnership for Peace in response to issues in Eastern Europe. This initiative was designed by the US Secretary of Defense Les Aspin who did not want to exclude Russia from international security arrangements. This was mainly an initiative launched to encourage states to build democracy and active participation towards maintaining international security. The program was also put in place in order to strengthen security cooperation with states in Central and Eastern Europe that were not part of the NATO alliance. In the NATO summit held between January 10 and 11, 1994, the PfP was established by NATO under the North Atlantic Council (NAC). It was claimed by Clinton that the partnership would give way for countries in Eastern Europe, including those that were part of the Soviet Union and even Russia itself to work together "for the best possible future for Europe".

The PfP Framework Document presented six areas of cooperation, including:

 To ensure transparency in national defense proceedings and budgeting procedures;
 To allow defense forces to be controlled through democratic methods;
 Under the jurisdiction of the United Nations or the Conference for Security and Cooperation in Europe (CSCE), states need to retain their ability and preparedness to contribute in constitutional behavior and operations;
 To enhance the ability for states to provide humanitarian missions such as peacekeeping and search and rescue as the main goal through building a cooperative militaristic relationship with NATO and other states involved;
 To build forces that can work with members of the NATO in the long run;
 To consult with and report to NATO if threats made to the security, territory or sovereignty of a participating state are detected.

States were also promised offices at the NATO headquarters and at a Partnership Coordination Cell which was located near the SHAPE (Supreme Headquarters Allied Powers Europe). States participating in the initiative were to receive perks for cooperating, albeit less than states who had already had full membership in the NATO alliance. NATO along with the US government announced that the existing alliance members would only need minimal contributions towards the cost of the initiative while the PfP members would have to fund for most of the cost of the program. The PfP also increased the possibility for participating states who were not part of the NATO alliance to be an official member, but never actually guaranteed a NATO membership. It was claimed that the PfP was used to delay decisions regarding the move towards expanding NATO membership to non-NATO members in Europe. It was also perceived as a devised plot by the West to prepare Eastern European states for the formation of a European Union by turning them into democratic states through military cooperation. By mid-October 1994, 22 states were part of the PfP.

Membership

On April 26, 1995, Malta became a member of PfP; it left on October 27, 1996, in order to maintain its neutrality. On March 20, 2008, Malta decided to reactivate their PfP membership; this was accepted by NATO at the summit in Bucharest on April 3, 2008. During the NATO summit in Riga on November 29, 2006,  Bosnia and Herzegovina, Montenegro, and Serbia were invited to join PfP, which they did on December 14, 2006.

Current members

Finland 

Finland's cooperation with NATO and participation in the PfP demonstrates that it has gained access to information and gained influence on security-related decisions, and that Finland is doing its part in managing crises in the European-Atlantic region. It is hoped that a strengthened partnership with the Euro-Atlantic Partnership Council (EAPC) will benefit the security and stability of the Baltic region. The Finnish government's 1997 defense white paper strongly advocated the development of interoperability to support international crisis management in line with the PfP concept. The 1998-2008 defense program began in May 1997 at the "Spirit of PfP" training in northern Norway.

Sweden  
 
In 1994, Sweden's foreign minister declared that Sweden's policy could no longer be classified as neutral because the collapse of the former Soviet Union and the extinction of the Warsaw Treaty had eliminated two alliances to be classified as neutral. In 1996, 61% of the Swedish preferred to participate in future European defense cooperation, and 55% believed Sweden should strengthen its relationship with NATO. For Sweden, the PfP is an "essential component of the emerging European security order." In 1997, Sweden participated in 15 different PfP field exercises, three of which were held and adopted 35 different interoperability objectives within the PfP's planning and review process.

Austria  

Austria's participation in PfP was strengthened in 1996. Their views on PfP focused on maintaining the ability and readiness to contribute to operations 'under the authority and/or responsibility of the United Nations and/or NATO and/or OSCE'. An important area of Austrian PfP contribution is private emergency planning. 30% of all PfP activities in this field came from Austria in 1997. In that year, Austria participated in 227 activities, including 14 peacekeeping operations involving 713 people, within the framework of the NATO/PfP program.

Aspiring members

Cyprus

Cyprus is the only European Union member state that is neither a NATO member state nor a member of the PfP program. The Parliament of Cyprus adopted a resolution in February 2011 that Cyprus should seek membership in the program, but the then President of Cyprus Demetris Christofias did not act on it, saying it would hamper his attempts to negotiate an end to the nation's dispute with Northern Cyprus (only recognized by Turkey) and demilitarize the island. Turkey, a full member of NATO, is likely to veto any attempt by Cyprus to engage with NATO until the dispute is resolved. Christofias' successor, Nicos Anastasiades, has publicly supported PfP membership for Cyprus, though his foreign minister and successor Nicos Christodoulides has dismissed Cypriot membership of NATO or Partnership for Peace, preferring to keep Cyprus’ foreign and defence affairs within the framework of the European Union.

Kosovo

Kosovo has described PfP membership as a tactical and strategic objective of the government. Kosovo submitted an application to join the PfP program in July 2012. However, four NATO member states, Greece, Romania, Spain and Slovakia, do not recognize Kosovo's independence and have threatened to block their participation in the program.  To be eligible to join, the Kosovan Armed Forces must be established.

Previous members

Fourteen former member states of the PfP (namely Albania, Bulgaria, Croatia, Czech Republic, Estonia, Hungary, Latvia, Lithuania, Montenegro, North Macedonia, Poland, Romania, Slovakia, and Slovenia) have subsequently joined NATO.

Note
1.as Republic of Macedonia before February 2019.

Legacy 
During the post-Cold War era, equal distribution of opportunities to contribute to peacekeeping operations was made, but the status of middle and neutral powers such as Sweden, Finland, and Ireland also decreased. Therefore, neutral countries also faced a situation in which they had to reconsider maintaining military neutrality in the current international political unipolar system. In June 1997, a senior NATO official said a broader role was aimed at working closer with NATO and finally joining the alliance. While the PfP provides a framework for cooperative relations with Russia, it did not include a membership into NATO. Although the PfP has made important contributions to crisis management, such as peacekeeping operations, Ireland is still not a NATO member.

Evolution 
In 2001, NATO granted ‘Membership Action Plans (MAP) to nine of the 26 PfP countries, this program of assistance assures that member states have political advice by NATO. In 2002, NATO began the Individual Partnership Action Plan (IPAP) initiative during the 2002 Prague Summit. The goal of this plan was to provide member states of PfP a chance to be granted assistance from NATO to ''establish reform goals'' without the pressure of committing to NATO.

In 2003: The Alliance assumed strategic command, control, and coordination of the mission and established a permanent International Security Assistance Force (ISAF) headquarters in Kabul. Since then, the operation has grown to about 120,000 troops from 47 countries.

During  NATO's 2004 Istanbul Summit, the Istanbul Cooperation Initiative was launched. During this summit, six countries of the Gulf Cooperation Council were included. Over the course of the summit, NATO also established the less formalized Partners across the Globe initiative.

In 2008, the PfP had implications during the conflict in Georgia. In August 2008, following a planned attack from Georgia against Tskhinvali, President Dmitry Medvedev referred to 8/08/08 as “Russia’s 9/11”. This was caused from an attempt to ‘’control the breakaway republic’’ as it accommodated peacekeeping bases of Russia. This event had implications for the program as it perceived the representation of a former "U.S.-Georgia bilateral Train-and-Equip program" to an expansion for the program and its allies.

As of 2010, only three of the 22 current PfP countries (Bosnia-Herzegovina, Macedonia, and Montenegro) had MAPs’’. Additionally, ‘’11 PfP countries were contributing about 2,000 troops to the operation, and four Central Asian and two Caucasus partners were providing logistical and/or host nation support".

Partnership for Peace Education Initiative 
The PfP has pushed for education programs amongst members of both NATO and the PfP composed of professional military education. Its purpose is to ‘’contribute to peace and security in the Euro-Atlantic region and beyond.’’ These education programs and training are mostly focused on Central Asia and the South Caucasus.

Struggles with funding 
The Partnership for Peace has had ramification on its budget caused by the ever-changing formation of members. For instance, the average annual Wales Initiative Funding (WIF) established for the program was set at $43 million during the fiscal years of 1996 to 2005. In consequence of a decline in the number of countries participating in the program, annual funding was reduced to $29 million in fiscal years 2006 through 2010. Another factor includes the reduction of distribution of WIF funding in the program amongst aspiring members of NATO.

See also
 Atlantic Treaty Association
 Euro-Atlantic Partnership Council
 Foreign relations of NATO
 Individual Partnership Action Plan
 Partnership for Peace Information Management System

Notes

References

External links

 The Partnership for Peace programme
 Partnership for Peace Information Management System (PIMS) (archived 3 April 2005)
 Building a Partnership for Peace

Organizations established in 1994
International relations
NATO relations
1994 establishments in Belgium